"Kiss the Sky" is a song by the American singer and songwriter, Jason Derulo from his first greatest hits album, Platinum Hits. It was released as the album's promotional single on July 19, 2016. It was also originally intended to appear on the soundtrack of the 2016 animated film Storks, but did not eventually make it on the album. "Kiss the Sky" was written by Thomas Troelsen, Bonnie McKee, Jason Derulo, Madison Love, Michael Caren, and Terius Nash, and it was produced by Thomas Troelsen and Thomas Eriksen.

Composition
"Kiss the Sky" is a pop song with includes funk influences and "a roving bass line".

Live performances
On August 5, 2016, Derulo performed "Kiss the Sky" on The Tonight Show Starring Jimmy Fallon with The Roots as backing band.

Music video 
The video features Derulo and his friends partying and dancing in a hotel that appears to be in Miami, his home town.  Derulo has a Haitian flag tied around his leg.  The video concludes with a large, poolside dance scene at the aforementioned hotel.

Usage in media 
The song has appeared in the films Night School, Aramburu's Magical Mystery Tour, Storks, The Swan Princess: Princess Tomorrow, Pirate Today!, Nine Lives and Alpha and Omega: Dino Digs.

Personnel

Bonnie McKee – songwriting
Jason Derulo – songwriting, vocals
Madison Love – songwriting
Michael Caren – songwriting
Terius Nash – songwriting
Thomas Troelsen – songwriting, additional vocals, instruments, producer
Thomas Eriksen – producer
Chuck Gibson – guitar
David Parks – bass
Jonny Sjo – bass guitar
Nate Merchant – backing vocals, vocal producer
Sam Martin – backing vocals, vocal producer
Connor Martin – backing vocals
Jeremy Strong – backing vocals
Joy Martin – backing vocals

Olly Sheppard – backing vocals
Sean "Movie" Charles – backing vocals
Andre Tyler – backing vocals
Gustav Rasmussen – trombone
Ketil Duckert – trumpet
Thomas Edinger – saxophone
Frank Ramirez – engineer
Jeff Jackson – engineer
Josh Ra Collins – engineer
Lorenzo Cardona – engineer
Robin Florent – engineer
Sasha Sirota – engineer
Manny Marroquin – mixer
Chris Galland – mix engineer
Chris Gehringer – mastering

Credits adapted from Qobuz.com.

Charts

Certifications

References

2016 singles
2016 songs
Jason Derulo songs
Songs written by Thomas Troelsen
Songs written by Sam Martin (singer)
Songs written by Bonnie McKee
Songs written by Jason Derulo
Songs written by The-Dream
Songs written by Madison Love